is a 1956 Japanese film directed by Katsuhiko Tasaka

Cast
 Ichikawa Raizō VIII
 Michiko Saga
 Tokiko Mita
 Michiko Ai

References

1956 films
Daiei Film films
1950s Japanese films
Japanese romance films
1950s romance films
Japanese black-and-white films